Garth Anthony Crooks,  (born 10 March 1958) is an English football pundit and former professional player. He played from 1976 to 1990, for Stoke City, Tottenham Hotspur, Manchester United, West Bromwich Albion and Charlton Athletic. Throughout his career he was an active member of the Professional Footballers' Association and was elected the first black chairman of the union.

Club career
Crooks was born in Bucknall, Stoke-on-Trent, and is of Jamaican descent. He progressed through the youth ranks at Stoke City signing professional contract forms in March 1976. He made his debut in April at home to Coventry City becoming the first black player to play for Stoke since Roy Brown in the 1940s. In the 1976–77 season his first full season he was top-scorer albeit with just six goals as Stoke's financial problems saw them relegated to the Second Division. Many black players at the time suffered racist abuse from the stands. Crooks was no exception, but his "cocky arrogance" meant it did little to affect him. His pace caused problems for Second Division defences as he again top-scored with 19 in 1977–78 as Stoke failed to mount a serious promotion attempt. Manager Alan Durban decided to play Crooks as a winger at the start of the 1978–79 season, a decision which Crooks openly criticised. He was restored to his striker role with the season coming to an end which saw Stoke gain promotion by beating Notts County on the final day of the season. He scored 14 goals in 1979–80 as Stoke safely avoided relegation but tensions between Crooks and Durban resurfaced which led to Crooks handing in a transfer request.

In 1979, he played in a benefit match for West Bromwich Albion player Len Cantello, that saw a team of white players play against a team of black players.

He was sold to Tottenham Hotspur in the summer of 1980 for a fee of £650,000. He scored on his debut against Nottingham Forest, and formed a successful striking partnership with Steve Archibald. With Crooks leading the line, Spurs won the FA Cup in 1981 and 1982, and the 1984 UEFA Cup Final against Anderlecht (he was an unused substitute in the final's second leg). Crooks is frequently credited as the first black player to score in an FA Cup final for his equalising goal in a 3–2 win over Manchester City in 1981, though this was pre-dated by Bill Perry in 1953 and Mike Trebilcock in 1966. He later went on loan to Manchester United and had spells at West Bromwich Albion and Charlton Athletic before a knee injury forced his retirement in 1990. His career ended on a low note as Charlton were relegated from the First Division, just as the West Bromwich Albion side he had played in four seasons earlier had been.

International career
Crooks represented England at international level, making four appearances for the England under-21s, for whom he scored three goals.

Media career
In 1988, Crooks became the first black chairman of the Professional Footballers' Association but gave up the role after retiring in 1990. He first worked in the media as a guest presenter on 25 March 1982's Top of the Pops on BBC1 (with Peter Powell), then as a match analyst at the 1982 and 1990 World Cups, he later worked as Match of the Day'''s reporter at the England camp at Euro 2000 and the 2002 World Cup. In the 1999 Birthday Honours, he was appointed an Officer of the Order of the British Empire (OBE) "for services to the Institute of Professional Sport." Until 2022, he appeared regularly on Final Score as a pundit and on rare occasions on Match of the Day as a replacement for regular pundits and interviewing players for Football Focus''. He continues to name his Premier League team of the week each week on the BBC website.

Career statistics

A.  The "Other" column constitutes appearances and goals in the FA Charity Shield, Football League play-offs and Full Members Cup.

References

External links

 PFA profile of Garth Crooks 
 PFA profile of Garth Crooks Years:1988–1990
 BBC profile

1958 births
Living people
People from Bucknall, Staffordshire
Footballers from Stoke-on-Trent
English footballers
Association football forwards
Stoke City F.C. players
Tottenham Hotspur F.C. players
Manchester United F.C. players
West Bromwich Albion F.C. players
Charlton Athletic F.C. players
English Football League players
UEFA Cup winning players
England under-21 international footballers
English association football commentators
Alumni of The College of Haringey, Enfield and North East London
Officers of the Order of the British Empire
FA Cup Final players
Black British sportsmen
English people of Jamaican descent